Jay Case (born October 10, 1970) is an American politician who has served in the Connecticut House of Representatives from the 63rd district since 2013.

References

1970 births
Living people
Republican Party members of the Connecticut House of Representatives
Place of birth missing (living people)
21st-century American politicians